Suleman Lalani is an American politician and medical doctor who represents district 76 of the Texas House of Representatives. A member of the Democratic Party, Lulani is one of the first Muslim's and South Asian lawmakers in the Texas legislature.

Background
Lalani is a native of Pakistan. He has practiced medicine for nearly two decades, specializing in geriatrics.

Political career
Lalani and Representative Salman Bhojani are the first Muslim and South Asian lawmakers to serve in the Texas House of Representatives.

References

Living people
Members of the Texas House of Representatives
American geriatricians
American politicians of Pakistani descent
Year of birth missing (living people)